The 2018 Thailand Open (officially known as the Toyota Thailand Open 2018 for sponsorship reasons) was a badminton tournament which took place at Nimibutr Stadium in Bangkok, Thailand, from 10 to 15 July 2018 and had a total purse of $350,000.

Tournament
The 2018 Thailand Open was the thirteenth tournament of the 2018 BWF World Tour and also part of the Thailand Open championships, which had been held since 1984. This tournament was organized by the Badminton Association of Thailand with the sanction from BWF.

Venue
This international tournament was held at Nimibutr Stadium in Bangkok, Thailand.

Point distribution
Below is the point distribution for each phase of the tournament based on the BWF points system for the BWF World Tour Super 500 event.

Prize money
The total prize money for this tournament was US$350,000. Distribution of prize money was in accordance with BWF regulations.

Men's singles

Seeds

 Shi Yuqi (withdrew)
 Srikanth Kidambi (withdrew)
 Chen Long (withdrew)
 Prannoy Kumar (second round)
 Kenta Nishimoto (quarter-finals)
 Wang Tzu-wei (withdrew)
 Kazumasa Sakai (first round)
 Sameer Verma (first round)

Finals

Top half

Section 1

Section 2

Bottom half

Section 3

Section 4

Women's singles

Seeds

 Akane Yamaguchi (quarter-finals)
 P. V. Sindhu (final)
 Ratchanok Intanon (withdrew)
 Nozomi Okuhara (champion)
 Saina Nehwal (withdrew)
 Nitchaon Jindapol (first round)
 Zhang Beiwen (semi-finals)
 Sayaka Sato (second round)

Finals

Top half

Section 1

Section 2

Bottom half

Section 3

Section 4

Men's doubles

Seeds

 Takeshi Kamura / Keigo Sonoda (champions)
 Lee Jhe-huei / Lee Yang (second round)
 Takuto Inoue / Yuki Kaneko (semi-finals)
 Chen Hung-ling / Wang Chi-lin (first round)
 Liao Min-chun / Su Ching-heng (quarter-finals)
 Lu Ching-yao / Yang Po-han (second round)
 Takuro Hoki / Yugo Kobayashi (first round)
 Satwiksairaj Rankireddy / Chirag Shetty (first round)

Finals

Top half

Section 1

Section 2

Bottom half

Section 3

Section 4

Women's doubles

Seeds

 Yuki Fukushima / Sayaka Hirota (quarter-finals)
 Misaki Matsutomo / Ayaka Takahashi (final)
 Shiho Tanaka / Koharu Yonemoto (semi-finals)
 Greysia Polii / Apriyani Rahayu (champions)
 Jongkolphan Kititharakul / Rawinda Prajongjai (semi-finals)
 Gabriela Stoeva / Stefani Stoeva (second round)
 Mayu Matsumoto / Wakana Nagahara (quarter-finals)
 Naoko Fukuman / Kurumi Yonao (quarter-finals)

Finals

Top half

Section 1

Section 2

Bottom half

Section 3

Section 4

Mixed doubles

Seeds

 Chris Adcock / Gabrielle Adcock (final)
 Tan Kian Meng / Lai Pei Jing (first round)
 Wang Chi-lin / Lee Chia-hsin (semi-finals)
 Marcus Ellis / Lauren Smith (second round)
 Praveen Jordan / Melati Daeva Oktavianti (quarter-finals)
 Chan Peng Soon / Goh Liu Ying (withdrew)
 Dechapol Puavaranukroh / Sapsiree Taerattanachai (quarter-finals)
 Hafiz Faizal / Gloria Emanuelle Widjaja (champions)

Finals

Top half

Section 1

Section 2

Bottom half

Section 3

Section 4

References

External links
 Tournament Link

Thailand Open
Badminton, World Tour, Thailand Open
Badminton, World Tour, Thailand Open
Thailand Open (badminton)
Badminton, World Tour, Thailand Open